A finite element limit analysis (FELA) uses optimisation techniques to directly compute the upper or lower bound plastic collapse load (or limit load) for a mechanical system rather than time stepping to a collapse load, as might be undertaken with conventional non-linear finite element techniques. The problem may be formulated in either a kinematic or equilibrium form.

The technique has been used most significantly in the field of soil mechanics for the determination of collapse loads for geotechnical problems (e.g. slope stability analysis). An alternative technique which may be used to undertake similar direct plastic collapse computations using optimization is Discontinuity layout optimization.

Software for finite element limit analysis
 OptumG2 (2014-) General purpose software for 2D geotechnical applications.
 OptumG3 (2017-) General purpose software for 3D geotechnical applications.

See also
 Limit analysis

References

Further reading
 Kumar, Jyant, and Debasis Mohapatra. "Lower-bound finite elements limit analysis for Hoek-Brown materials using semidefinite programming." Journal of Engineering Mechanics 143.9 (2017): 04017077.
 Makrodimopoulos, A., and C. M. Martin. "Lower bound limit analysis of cohesive‐frictional materials using second‐order cone programming." International Journal for Numerical Methods in Engineering 66.4 (2006): 604-634.
 Kumar, Jyant, and Vishwas N. Khatri. "Bearing capacity factors of circular foundations for a general c–ϕ soil using lower bound finite elements limit analysis." International Journal for Numerical and Analytical Methods in Geomechanics 35.3 (2011): 393-405.
 Tang, Chong, Kim-Chuan Toh, and Kok-Kwang Phoon. "Axisymmetric lower-bound limit analysis using finite elements and second-order cone programming." Journal of Engineering Mechanics 140.2 (2013): 268-278.
 Kumar, Jyant, and Obaidur Rahaman. "Vertical uplift resistance of horizontal plate anchors for eccentric and inclined loads." Canadian Geotechnical Journal(2018).
 Mohapatra D, Kumar J. Collapse loads for rectangular foundations by three‐dimensional upper bound limit analysis using radial point interpolation method. Int J Numer Anal Methods Geomech. 2018;1–20. https://doi.org/10.1002/nag.2885

Structural analysis
Soil mechanics